Count Erwin Franz Ludwig Bernhard Ernst von Neipperg was an Austrian General of the Cavalry of Württembergian descent who was notable for being the main commander at the Battle of Aschaffenburg.

Biography

Family
Erwin was the youngest son of General Count Adam Albert von Neipperg and his first wife, Countess Theresa von Pola di Treviso (1778–1815). After his mother's death, Adam Albert would marry Archduchess Maria Luisa of Habsburg-Lorraine, Napoleon's widow and daughter of Emperor Franz II, thus acquiring the title of Count of Neipperg. His elder brother was Count .

Neipperg's first marriage was with the cantess Henriette von Waldstein-Wartenberg (1823–1845), who however died after a few months of marriage, and his second marriage was at in Gorizia with Princess Rosa von Lobkowitz (1832–1905), sister of Georg Christian von Lobkowitz and descendant of one of the oldest and most noble families of the Bohemian aristocracy. His wedding witness was Count , governor of Veneto. They had three children:

Count Reinhard (30 July 1856 – 15 January 1919), married Countess Gabriele Ida von Waldstein-Wartenberg (1857–1948).
Anna Berta (7 August 1857 – 9 April 1932), married Prince Ferdinand Zdenko von Lobkowitz (1858–1938).
Maria Hedwig (22 July 1859 – 23 October 1916), married Count Franz Xavier von Königsegg-Aulendorf (1858–1927).

Military career
Neipperg completed military studies and after the death of his father acquired, in coregency with his brothers Alfred, Ferdinand and Gustav, lead the village of Schwaigern with its annexation of Burg Neipperg, the hunting grounds in Kleingartach, Bönningheim and Erlingheim as well as lands in Schwaigern and a forest near Neipperg. In 1833, he and his brothers closed a trust on the succession, which gave all the property to the eldest son and regulated the succession in the event of the termination of a line of descendants.

Neipperg served for a long time in the Imperial Austrian Army as a cavalry officer in the garrison in Parma, where his stepmother Maria Luisa resided. He was promoted to colonel in 1848 and was commander of the Austrian garrison in Parma. He found himself to stem the weak insurrectional uprisings that took place in Parma and to support the heir to the throne, Carlo III of Parma. He participated in the battles of the First Italian War of Independence, distinguishing himself in Morozzo and Custoza. Subsequently, he was military governor of Gorizia until 1865; having been promoted to Feldmarschall-Leutnant in 1863.

Fiercely anti-Prussian and a supporter of a federation of German states led by the Austrian Empire, Neipperg participated in the Austro-Prussian War at the head of the 4th Division of the VIII Army Corps, composed of Austrian and Nassauian troops. On 14 July 1866, due to the pleas of Prince Alexander of Hesse and by Rhine for Austrian support in the Campaign of the Main, he clashed with the troops of the Prussian general August Karl von Goeben near Aschaffenburg. The Prussians, in clear numerical superiority with 16,600 men, won a crushing victory over Neipperg's troops that forced the Austrians, now decimated, to a hasty flight. Neipperg, after having been military commander of Bratislava and Vienna, left the Imperial Austrian Army and for some years served as head of the local militia of the Kingdom of Württemberg, leaving all military posts in 1878. Meanwhile he had been promoted to General of the Cavalry in 1870. In 1873 he had been awarded by Franz Joseph of Austria, the knighthood of the Order of the Golden Fleece. He also received the Order of the Gold Lion of the House of Nassau from Adolphe, Grand Duke of Luxembourg.

Ancestry

References

Bibliography
 
 
 Immo Eberl: Die Herren und Grafen von Neipperg. In: Heimatbuch der Stadt Schwaigern. Stadtverwaltung Schwaigern. Schwaigern 1994.
 
 Heinrich Friedjung: Neipperg, Erwin Franz Ludwig Bernhard Ernst Graf von. In: Anton Bettelheim (Hrsg.): Biographisches Jahrbuch und deutscher Nekrolog. Band 2, Seite 325–326, Georg Reimer, Berlin 1898, (Digitalisat).

1813 births
1897 deaths
Lieutenant generals of Württemberg
People of the First Italian War of Independence
Knights of the Golden Fleece
Recipients of the Order of St. Vladimir, 1st class
People of the Austro-Prussian War
People from Heilbronn (district)
Edlers of Austria
Austro-Hungarian generals
Military personnel from Baden-Württemberg
Austrian military personnel of the Second Schleswig War